Zoran Živković (born 12 September 1967) is a Croatian former footballer who played as a defender and made one appearance for the Croatia national team.

Career
Živković earned his first and only cap for Croatia on 25 June 1993 in a friendly against Ukraine. He started in the home fixture, which was played in Zagreb, but was substituted out at half-time for Josip Gašpar. The match finished as a 3–1 win for Croatia.

Career statistics

International

References

External links
 

1967 births
Living people
Association football defenders
Yugoslav footballers
Croatian footballers
Croatia international footballers
NK Inter Zaprešić players
GNK Dinamo Zagreb players
HNK Segesta players
NK Marsonia players
HNK Šibenik players
Croatian Football League players